OTG may refer to:
 Octylthioglucoside, a detergent
 Off-the-grid, a lifestyle without access to public utilities
 On-The-Go, a USB communications standard for portable devices
 One-Two-GO Airlines (ICAO code), a defunct Thai air carrier
 Oven-Toast-Grill